Route 616 is a  long mostly north–south secondary highway in the eastern portion of New Brunswick, Canada.

The route starts at Route 104 between Morehouse Corner and Zealand where it travels mostly northeast past Zealand. It crosses over the Mactaquac Basin before passing Tripp Settlement. The road travels through Keswick Ridge and past Mactaquac Heights before ending at Route 105 in McKeens Corner on the north bank of the Saint John River close to the Mactaquac Dam.

History

See also

References

616
616